The 2002–03 NBA season was the Jazz's 29th season in the National Basketball Association, and 24th season in Salt Lake City, Utah. During the off-season, the Jazz signed free agents Matt Harpring, Calbert Cheaney, and Mark Jackson. The team struggled losing seven of their first ten games, but then posted a six-game winning streak afterwards, and held a 29–20 record at the All-Star break. The Jazz finished third in the Midwest Division with a 47–35 record, and qualified for the playoffs for the twentieth straight season.

Karl Malone averaged 20.6 points, 7.8 rebounds, 4.7 assists and 1.7 steals per game, while Harpring averaged 17.6 points and 6.6 rebounds per game, second-year forward Andrei Kirilenko provided the team with 12.0 points, 5.3 rebounds, 1.5 steals and 2.2 blocks per game, and John Stockton contributed 10.8 points, 7.7 assists and 1.7 steals per game. In addition, Cheaney contributed 8.6 points per game, and Greg Ostertag provided with 6.2 rebounds and 1.8 blocks per game.

However, the Jazz once again failed to make it out of the first round, losing to the Sacramento Kings in five games in the Western Conference First Round for the second consecutive season. This season also marked the end of the Stockton and Malone era. Stockton and Malone were both given a long standing ovation after Game 4 at the Delta Center, and another one after Game 5 at the ARCO Arena, as Stockton retired ending his nineteen-year career with the Jazz. Following the season, Malone signed as a free agent with the Los Angeles Lakers after eighteen seasons in Utah, while Cheaney signed with the Golden State Warriors, and Jackson was released to free agency.

The Jazz would not return to the playoffs until 2007.

Draft picks

Roster

Preseason

Game log

|- bgcolor="ccffcc"
| 1
| October 6
| @ Seattle
| 89 – 82
|
|
|
| KeyArena9,264
| 1–0
|- bgcolor="#ffcccc"
| 2
| October 8
| @ Portland
| 93 – 80
|
|
|
| Rose Garden Arena13,672
| 1–1
|- bgcolor="#ffcccc"
| 3
| October 10
| @ Sacramento
| 102 – 92
|
|
|
| ARCO Arena11,280
| 1–2
|- bgcolor="#ffcccc"
| 4
| October 15
| NY Knicks
| 89 – 83
|
|
|
| Delta Center14,921
| 1–3
|- bgcolor="#ffcccc"
| 5
| October 18
| @ Cleveland
| 95 – 91
|
|
|
| Gund Arena5,114
| 1–4
|- bgcolor="ccffcc"
| 6
| October 19
| @ Philadelphia
| 107 – 99
|
|
|
| First Union Center17,178
| 2–4
|- bgcolor="ccffcc"
| 7
| October 22
| @ NY Knicks
| 94 – 89
|
|
|
| Madison Square Garden14,000
| 3–4
|- bgcolor="ccffcc"
| 8
| October 24
| Toronto
| 89 – 82
|
|
|
| Delta Center14,133
| 4–4
|-

Regular season

Season standings

Record vs. opponents

Game log

Playoffs

|- align="center" bgcolor="#ffcccc"
| 1
| April 19
| @ Sacramento
| L 90–96
| Karl Malone (25)
| Greg Ostertag (11)
| Karl Malone (8)
| ARCO Arena17,317
| 0–1
|- align="center" bgcolor="#ffcccc"
| 2
| April 21
| @ Sacramento
| L 95–108
| Andrei Kirilenko (17)
| Matt Harpring (8)
| Mark Jackson (4)
| ARCO Arena17,317
| 0–2
|- align="center" bgcolor="#ccffcc"
| 3
| April 26
| Sacramento
| W 107–104
| Greg Ostertag (22)
| Greg Ostertag (12)
| John Stockton (7)
| Delta Center19,911
| 1–2
|- align="center" bgcolor="#ffcccc"
| 4
| April 28
| Sacramento
| L 82–99
| Karl Malone (24)
| Greg Ostertag (14)
| John Stockton (7)
| Delta Center19,911
| 1–3
|- align="center" bgcolor="#ffcccc"
| 5
| April 30
| @ Sacramento
| L 91–111
| Harpring, Padgett (16)
| Scott Padgett (6)
| John Stockton (7)
| ARCO Arena17,317
| 1–4
|-

Player statistics

Season

Playoffs

Awards and records

Transactions

Overview

Player Transactions Citation:

References

Utah Jazz seasons
Utah
Utah
Utah